P. M. Ellison was an American politician in Nevada.

He became one of the three county commissioners of Nye County after he was elected to that office on November 5, 1872. Ellison resigned a year later, and was replaced by Joseph Stowe. He was elected to the Assembly, where he represented Nye County alongside John B. McGee, on November 3, 1874 as a Democrat.

Ellison's term started the next day, and he served during one session. His mandate ended in November 1876, when Ellison and McGee were succeeded by Thomas J. Bell and J. A. Caldwell.

References

County commissioners in Nevada
Democratic Party members of the Nevada Assembly
People from Nye County, Nevada
Year of death missing
Year of birth missing
19th-century American politicians